Robert Lee Byrd is a lobbyist and former Democratic state representative from Delaware. His 2019 memoir is titled Byrd of Legislative Hall.

References

Delaware Democrats
American lobbyists
Year of birth missing (living people)
Living people
Place of birth missing (living people)
21st-century American politicians